The 2003 Kaduna State gubernatorial election occurred on April 19, 2003. Ahmed Makarfi of the PDP defeated five other candidates by polling 1,143,890 popular votes, ANPP's Suleiman Hunkuyi was closest contender with 668,446 votes.

Ahmed Makarfi defeated Samaila Yakawada and others at the PDP 
primary election to get the party's nomination. He retained Stephen Rijo Shekari as his running mate.

Electoral system 
The Governor of Kaduna State is elected using the plurality voting system.

Results
A total of six candidates registered with the Independent National Electoral Commission to contest in the election. The PDP candidate won, defeating ANPP's Alh. Suleiman Hunkuyi, and four other minor party candidates.

The total number of registered voters in the state was 2,620,999. However, only about 77.02% (i.e. 2,018,689) of registered voters participated in the exercise.

References 

Kaduna State gubernatorial elections
Kaduna State gubernatorial election
Kaduna State gubernatorial election